Medium-chain acyl-CoA dehydrogenase (fatty acyl coenzyme A dehydrogenase (ambiguous), acyl coenzyme A dehydrogenase (ambiguous), acyl dehydrogenase (ambiguous), fatty-acyl-CoA dehydrogenase (ambiguous), acyl CoA dehydrogenase (ambiguous), general acyl CoA dehydrogenase (ambiguous), medium-chain acyl-coenzyme A dehydrogenase, acyl-CoA:(acceptor) 2,3-oxidoreductase (ambiguous), ACADM (gene name).) is an enzyme with systematic name medium-chain acyl-CoA:electron-transfer flavoprotein 2,3-oxidoreductase. This enzyme catalyses the following chemical reaction

 a medium-chain acyl-CoA + electron-transfer flavoprotein  a medium-chain trans-2,3-dehydroacyl-CoA + reduced electron-transfer flavoprotein

This enzyme contains FAD as prosthetic group and participates in fatty acid metabolism and PPAR signaling pathway.

References

External links 
 

EC 1.3.8